Matthew's Days is a 1968 Polish drama film directed by Witold Leszczyński. It was listed to compete at the 1968 Cannes Film Festival, but the festival was cancelled due to the events of May 1968 in France. The film was also selected as the Polish entry for the Best Foreign Language Film at the 41st Academy Awards, but was not accepted as a nominee.

The film is based on Tarjei Vesaas' novel The Birds.

Cast
 Franciszek Pieczka - Mateusz
 Anna Milewska - Olga, sister of Mateusz
 Wirgiliusz Gryń - Jan
 Aleksander Fogiel - Host
 Hanna Skarżanka - Hostess
 Małgorzata Braunek - Anna
 Maria Janiec - Ewa
 Elzbieta Nowacka - Girl
 Kazimierz Borowiec - Boy
 Aleksander Iwaniec - Hunter
 Joanna Szczerbic

See also
 List of submissions to the 41st Academy Awards for Best Foreign Language Film
 List of Polish submissions for the Academy Award for Best Foreign Language Film

References

External links

1968 films
1968 drama films
1960s Polish-language films
Polish black-and-white films
Films directed by Witold Leszczyński
Films based on Norwegian novels
Films based on works by Tarjei Vesaas
Polish drama films